Jakob Vanlalhlimpuia is an Indian professional footballer who plays as a winger.

Career
Born in Hnahthial, Vanlalhlimpuia started his career playing for Venglai Sports Club in his native state of Mizoram. After spending some time at the club, he was part of the India national under-17 football team Camp. Later, he joined the Shillong Lajong Academy before signing for Mizoram Premier League side, Chanmari.

In the summer of 2018, Vanlalhlimpuia signed for Pune City of the Indian Super League. He made his competitive debut for the club during their opening game of the season on 3 October 2018 against Delhi Dynamos. He started and played 69 minutes as Pune City drew the match 1–1.

Career statistics

References

External links 
 Indian Super League Profile.

Living people
People from Mizoram
Indian footballers
Chanmari FC players
FC Pune City players
Association football midfielders
Footballers from Mizoram
Mizoram Premier League players
Indian Super League players
1999 births